Keith Wiggans (born September 6, 1981 in Athens, Georgia) is a former American soccer player.

Career

College
Wiggans attended Athens Academy in Athens, Georgia, where he was part of the team which went to the 1999 Georgia state soccer championship final. He then played college soccer at the College of Charleston from 2000 to 2004.

Professional
Wiggans signed with the Charleston Battery of the USL First Division on May 28, 2005. He has served as a backup to Dusty Hudock for the majority of his professional career.

Coaching
In 2007, he was an assistant on the College of Charleston women's soccer team.

In December 2019, he was promoted to head College of Charleston men's soccer coach, after serving the previous eleven seasons as an assistant coach.

Honors

Charleston Battery
USL Second Division Champions (1): 2010

References

External links
 Charleston Battery bio

1981 births
Living people
American soccer coaches
American soccer players
Association football goalkeepers
Charleston Battery players
College of Charleston Cougars men's soccer coaches
College of Charleston Cougars men's soccer players
USL Championship players
USL First Division players
USL Second Division players